Courtney John Lyndhurst Jones,  (born 30 April 1933) is a British former ice dancer. With partner June Markham, he was the 1957 and 1958 World champion and European champion. With partner Doreen Denny, he is the 1959 and 1960 World champion and 1959–61 European champion.

Jones and Peri Horne created the Starlight Waltz and the Silver Samba compulsory dances. He was awarded the OBE in 1980 for services to ice skating.

He is a member of the International Skating Union Council and is a former president of the National Ice Skating Association. He was inducted into the World Figure Skating Hall of Fame in 1986.

Results
(with June Markham)

(with Doreen Denny)

References

 
 

British male ice dancers
1933 births
Living people
Figure skating officials
Officers of the Order of the British Empire
World Figure Skating Championships medalists
European Figure Skating Championships medalists